Abraham Charles Vigoda (February 24, 1921 – January 26, 2016) was an American actor known for his portrayals of Salvatore Tessio in The Godfather (1972) and Phil Fish in both Barney Miller (1975–1977, 1982) and Fish (1977–1978).

Early life
Vigoda was born in Brooklyn, New York, on February 24, 1921, the son of Samuel Vigoda and Lena Moses, Jewish immigrants from Russia. His father was a tailor who had two other sons: Hy and Bill. The latter was a comic book artist who drew for the Archie Comics franchise and others in the 1940s. Upon leaving school, Vigoda worked as a printer before enlisting in the U.S. Army in 1943, serving in World War II. After his military service, he studied acting on the GI Bill at the American Theatre Wing. In the late 1940s, he began working in radio and made his television debut in an installment of the live drama series Studio One.

Career

Vigoda began acting while in his 20s, working with the American Theatre Wing. His career as a professional actor began in 1947.

He gained acting notability in the 1960s with his work in Broadway productions, including Marat/Sade (1967), portraying Mad Animal; The Man in the Glass Booth (1968), portraying Landau; Inquest (1970); and Tough to Get Help (1972), portraying Abraham Lincoln.

His best known film role is that of Salvatore Tessio in The Godfather (1972). He also appeared briefly in The Godfather Part II in a flashback sequence at the end of the film. According to Francis Ford Coppola's commentary on the DVD's widescreen edition, Vigoda landed the role of Tessio in an "open call", in which actors who did not have agents could come in for an audition.

He gained further fame as Phil Fish on Barney Miller, a character known for his world-weary demeanor and persistent hemorrhoids. Vigoda landed the role after an unusual audition, in which he unwittingly displayed that he was a perfect fit for the role:

Vigoda's character on Barney Miller was popular, and a spin off television series, Fish, was created for him in 1977. The series, a situation comedy, ran from February 5, 1977, to May 18, 1978.

Mistaken reports of death
Prior to his actual death in January 2016, Vigoda was a repeated victim of mistaken death announcements. These led to jokes, often with Vigoda as participant.

In 1982 People magazine mistakenly referred to Vigoda as dead. At the time, Vigoda, aged 60, was performing in a stage play in Calgary. He took the mistake with good humor, posing for a photograph published in Variety in which he was sitting up in a coffin, holding the erroneous issue of People. Jeff Jarvis, a People employee at the time, said that the magazine's editors were known for "messing up" stories and one of them repeatedly inserted the phrase "the late" in reference to Vigoda, even after a researcher correctly removed it. The erroneous version was what went to print.

In 1987 the same mistake was made when a reporter for WWOR, Channel 9 in Secaucus, New Jersey, mistakenly referred to him as the "late Abe Vigoda". She realized and corrected her mistake the next day.

He had been the subject of many running gags pertaining to the mistaken reports of his death. In 1997 Vigoda appeared in Good Burger as the character Otis, a restaurant's French fry man. Several jokes were made about his advanced age, including his character Otis saying, "I should've died years ago." That same year, he was shopping at Bloomingdale's in Manhattan when the salesman remarked, "You look like Abe Vigoda. But you can't be Abe Vigoda because he's dead." A Late Night with David Letterman skit showed Letterman trying to summon Vigoda's ghost, but Vigoda walked in and declared, "I'm not dead yet, you pinhead!"

At a New York Friars Club roast of Rob Reiner which Vigoda attended, Billy Crystal joked, "I have nothing to say about Abe. I was always taught to speak well of the dead."

In May 2001 a website was created with only one purpose: to report whether Vigoda was alive or dead. In addition, in 2005, a "tongue-in-cheek" Firefox extension was released with the sole purpose of telling the browser user Vigoda's status.

Continuing with the gag, he appeared frequently to make fun of his status on Late Night with Conan O'Brien, including a guest appearance on the show's final episode. At the 1998 New York Friars Club roast of Drew Carey, with Vigoda in the audience, Jeff Ross joked, "My one regret is that Abe Vigoda isn't alive to see this." He followed that with "Drew, you go to Vegas; what's the over–under on Abe Vigoda?" On January 23, 2009, Vigoda appeared live on The Today Show. He said he was doing well, joked about previous reports of his death and announced he had just completed a voice-over for an H&R Block commercial to air during the Super Bowl.

Vigoda and Betty White, both 88 years old at the time, appeared in "Game", a Snickers commercial that debuted during Super Bowl XLIV on February 7, 2010. The synopsis made fun of the advanced age of the actors. The Super Bowl Ad Meter poll respondents rated the ad the highest of any shown during the game.

Personal life
Vigoda and his first wife Sonja Gohlke had one daughter named Carol. The marriage ended in divorce. His second marriage to Beatrice Schy lasted from 1968 until her death in 1992.

Vigoda enjoyed playing handball and stated in an interview that he was "almost" a champion at the game in his youth.

Death
On January 26, 2016, one month before his 95th birthday, Vigoda died in his sleep at his daughter Carol Fuchs' home in Woodland Park, New Jersey, of natural causes. He had gone there "to escape the hazards of a blizzard."

Vigoda's funeral was held on January 31, 2016. Notable figures including comic Gilbert Gottfried, former New York City mayor David Dinkins, and stand-up comedian Jeff Ross attended. He was buried in the Beth David Cemetery at Elmont, Nassau County, New York.

On the 2017 Academy Awards show, Vigoda was not included in the show's memorial reel, surprising many and prompting a small PR backlash.

Filmography

Film

 Three Rooms in Manhattan (1965) as Waiter (uncredited)
 The Godfather (1972) as Salvatore Tessio
 The Devil's Daughter (1973) as Alikhine
 The Don Is Dead (1973) as Don Talusso
 The Story of Pretty Boy Floyd (1974) as Dominic Morrell
 Newman's Law (1974) as John Dellanzia
 The Godfather Part II (1974) as Salvatore Tessio
 Having Babies (1976) as Al Schneider
 The Cheap Detective (1978) as Sgt. Rizzuto
 Death Car on the Freeway (1979) as Mr. Frisch
 Gridlock (1980) as Herb
 The Big Stuffed Dog (1981) as Carnival Pitchman
 Cannonball Run II (1984) as Caesar
 The Stuff (1985) as Special Guest Star in Stuff Commercial (cameo)
 Vasectomy: A Delicate Matter (1986) as Detective Abe Fossi
 Plain Clothes (1987) as Mr. Wiseman
 Grandmother’s House (1988) as the Grandpa
 Look Who's Talking (1989) as Grandpa
 Prancer (1989) as Orel Benton
 Keaton's Cop (1990) as Louis Keaton

 Fist of Honor (1993) as Victor Malucci
 Sugar Hill (1993) as Gus Molino
 Me and the Kid (1993) as Pawn Broker
 Batman: Mask of the Phantasm (1993) as Salvatore Valestra (voice)
 North (1994) as Alaskan Grandpa
 Home of Angels (1994) as Grandpa
 Jury Duty (1995) as Judge Powell
 The Misery Brothers (1995) as Don Frito Layleone
 Love Is All There Is (1996) as Rudy
 Saturday Night Live (1996) as himself
 Underworld (1996) as Will Cassady
 Good Burger (1997) as Otis
 Me and the Gods (1997) as Zeus
 A Brooklyn State of Mind (1997) as Uncle Guy
 Witness to the Mob (1998) as Paul Castellano
 Just the Ticket (1999) as Arty
 Chump Change (2000) as The Frog
 Tea Cake or Cannoli (2000)
 Crime Spree (2003) as Angelo Giancarlo
 Farce of the Penguins (2007) as Penguin from Boca (voice)
 The Unknown Trilogy (2007) as Uncle Morty (segment "Frankie the Squirrel")
 Sweet Destiny (2014) (final film role)

Television

 Studio One (1949)
 Dark Shadows (cast member in 1969) as Ezra Braithwaite
 Sesame Street (1973) guest appearance
 Toma (1973) as Donzer
 Mannix (1973) as Anton Valine
 Hawaii Five-O (1974) as Abe Kemper
 Barney Miller (cast member from 1975–1977)
 The Bionic Woman (1976) as Barlow
 Fish (1977–1978) as Det. Phil Fish
 Cannon (1975) as Mr Couzellous
 The Comedy Company (1978) as Jake
 How to Pick Up Girls! (1978) as Nathan Perlmutter
 The Rockford Files (1978) as Phil 'The Dancer' Gabriel / Al Dancer
 $weepstake$ (ep. 1, 1979) as Anthony
 B. J. and the Bear (1980) as Grandpa Ben Rule
 The Littlest Hobo (1980) as Howard Mattson
 As the World Turns (cast member in 1985) 
 Tales from the Darkside"A Choice of Dreams" (1986) as Jake Corelli
 Superboy (Season 1, Episode 3 "Back to Oblivion"1988) as Mr. Wagner
 Santa Barbara (cast member in 1989) as Lyle DeFranco
 Monsters (ep. "The Gift"1990) as Dolan
 MacGyver (ep. 7 season 6) as Bill Cody
 Lucky Luke (1993) as Judge Rinehart
 Law & Order"Remand" (1996) as Ret. Detective Landis
 Wings"All about Christmas Eve" (1996) as Harry
 The Norm Show"Norm, Crusading Social Worker" (1999) as Sal 
 Family Guy – "The Kiss Seen Around the World" as Himself (voice)
 Late Night with Conan O'Brien (recurring) as Himself
 High School USA! (ep. 12, 2013) as Otto

Video game

References

General references

External links

 
 
 
 
 

1921 births
2016 deaths
American male film actors
American male television actors
American people of Russian-Jewish descent
Jewish American male actors
Male actors from New York City
People from Brooklyn
United States Army personnel of World War II
20th-century American male actors
21st-century American male actors
Burials at Beth David Cemetery
People from the Upper East Side
21st-century American Jews
Members of The Lambs Club